Modugno is a town and comune of the Metropolitan City of Bari, Apulia, southern Italy.

Before the 1970s this town was mainly dedicated to agriculture; since construction of an industrial zone, it has become an important factory site in the region. The landscape is mainly flat.

History
This site has been inhabited since prehistory. The current town was likely founded in the early Middle Ages, during the Byzantine domination of northern Italy; in the 11th century it came under the control of the Normans. During the 19th century, the town came under the local rule of the Dragone Family.

Main sights
Sanctuary of Santa Maria della Grotta: this sanctuary originated as a rock church in the 8th century, where Basilian monks took refuge during the Iconoclast controversy in Byzantium. In the 11th century a Benedictine abbey was constructed, which was used by crusaders en route to the Holy Land during the following centuries. In 1313 the abbey was suppressed by King Robert of Naples and abandoned.
Church of Santa Maria Santissima Annunziata: In the 11th century, this church was the cathedral of the short-lived diocese of Modugno. It was restored in 1347–1518 and again in 1626 under the direction of Bartolomeo Amendola. The church consists of a large single nave, with a large . The  bell tower, in Apulian Romanesque style, was completed in 1615; it features a series of mullioned windows and stands and more than 60 m. The interior houses the Annunciation (1472) by Bartolomeo Vivarini. 
Church  of Sant'Antonio: this small Byzantine structure was built in the 14th century outside the medieval walls.
Church of San Giovanni Battista (14th century): this Byzantine-style church was once associated to a city hospital
Church of San Giuseppe delle Monacelle: This 16th and 17th century church was built and decorated in Baroque style.
Sala del Sedile dei Nobili (current appearance dating from the 18th century)
Municipal Palace: Now a city hall, the structure retains a cloister and bell tower from the original Benedictine abbey
Palazzo Angarano-Maranta (18th century) and Palazzo del I ramo della famiglia Capitaneo (16th century), both in Renaissance style.
Il Monaco menhir, on the road towards Bitonto

References

External links
Official website 

Cities and towns in Apulia